Louis Joseph D'Arrigo (born 23 September 2001), is an Australian professional footballer who plays as a midfielder for Adelaide United. He is of Maltese descent.

Club career

Adelaide United
D'Arrigo made his professional debut in a Round 21 clash against Sydney FC, replacing Ryan Strain in the 86th minute as Adelaide lost the game 2–0. After a standout 2017–18 Y-League campaign, D’Arrigo was named the league's Player of the Year at the Dolan Warren Awards in April. On 24 July 2018, he signed his first professional contract with Adelaide, penning a two-year scholarship deal with the club.

Honours

Club
Adelaide United
 FFA Cup: 2019

International
Australia U20
AFF U-19 Youth Championship: 2019

Australia U17
AFF U-16 Youth Championship: 2016

Individual
Y-League Player of the Year: 2017–18
Adelaide United Youth Player of the Year: 2018–19

References

External links

2001 births
Living people
Australian soccer players
Soccer players from Adelaide
Association football midfielders
Adelaide United FC players
A-League Men players
National Premier Leagues players
Australian people of Italian descent